The Finnish Navy is one of the branches of the Finnish Defence Forces. The navy employs 2,300 people and about 4,300 conscripts are trained each year. Finnish Navy vessels are given the ship prefix "FNS", short for "Finnish Navy ship", but this is not used in Finnish language contexts. The Finnish Navy also includes coastal forces and coastal artillery.

Organization 
The current Commander of the Navy is rear admiral Jori Harju. The navy is organized into the Navy Command, three Brigade-level units, and the Naval Academy. Since 1998 the navy also includes the Nyland Brigade in Dragsvik, where Finnish Marines or Coastal Jaegers are trained. Nyland Brigade is also the only Swedish language unit in the country and it carries on the traditions and battle-honours of the Nyland (Uusimaa) Regiment of the Swedish Army.

Locations 
 Navy Command headquarters: (Heikkilä, Turku)
 Naval depot: Pansio and Kimito
 Naval research depot: Espoo

Bases 

 Coastal Brigade: (Upinniemi, Kirkkonummi)
 Coastal Fleet: (Pansio, Turku)
Commander
Headquarters (Pansio)
4th Minecountermeasures squadron (Pansio)
Mine countermeasures
MHCs Katanpää, Purunpää and Vahterpää
Home Defence Troops' Mine Sweeping Group Sääksi (Kuha  and Kiiski classes)
Diving
6th Surface Warfare Squadron (Pansio)
Minelaying
Anti-surface warfare
Anti-submarine warfare
Anti-air warfare
2nd Mine Unit (MLC Uusimaa, MLI Pansio)
2nd Missile Unit (Rauma class)
7th Surface Warfare Squadron (Upinniemi)
Minelaying
Anti-surface warfare
Anti-air warfare
Anti-submarine warfare
MLC Hämeenmaa
1st Missile Unit (Hamina class)
1st Mine Unit (MLI Porkkala, MLI Pyhäranta)
8th Service Support Squadron (Pansio and Upinniemi)
Maritime supply and transport
Oil destruction
Garrison support services
1st Transport Unit,
2nd Transport Unit,
Support Company (Military police platoon, Support Platoon, Harbour and transport centre, Materiel Centre, NCO Course)
Home Defence Troops' Protection Company
 Nyland Brigade: (Dragsvik, Ekenäs)
 Naval Academy: (Suomenlinna, Helsinki)

Mobilization strength 
Total of 31,500 personnel

History 
During the Swedish era, the Finnish Gulf saw many battles between the Swedish and Russian fleets. Many of the Swedish naval bases were located in present-day Finland and many sailors came from Finland (see Archipelago Fleet).

During the Russian rule (1809–1917) an entirely Finnish Navy unit, named Suomen Meriekipaasi was
defending the Finnish coast, alongside the Baltic Fleet of the Imperial Russian Navy. The Meriekipaasi participated in the Crimean War, albeit mostly with on-shore duties. The Meriekipaasi also manned the coastal batteries at the Santahamina Island during the siege of fortress Viapori in Helsinki.  The ships the Meriekipaasi operated included the steam frigates  and Kalevala, named after the Finnish national epic. These ships later served in the Russian Pacific Fleet).

Independent Finland 
The first ships that the independent Finnish Navy obtained were a mix of obsolete vessels left behind by the Russians during the Finnish Civil War and vessels that had not been able to make the winter voyage to Kronstadt as the Russian Navy retreated from German forces. Thus, the Finnish Navy of the late 1910s and early 1920s consisted of a few gunboats (and ), six S-class torpedo boats, eight C-class torpedo boats, one minelayer, several minesweepers, and five T-class minelaying boats. In addition to the warships, the Russians also left behind numerous other types of vessels.

Additionally, the Germans handed over two netlayers ( and ) to the Finnish Navy, and these two ships formed the core of the Finnish Navy until the coastal defence ships were commissioned. With the Treaty of Tartu, Finland had to return some of the equipment they had operated earlier. This equipment included three S-class torpedo boats (S3, S4 and S6), the minesweepers Altair, Mikula, MP 7, MP 11, Ahvola, T 12, fifteen tugs, four smaller transports and 54 motorboats. Finland lost three more ships (the torpedo boats C1, C2 and C3) in supporting the British campaign in the Baltic Sea. The three vessels remained in the Baltic even when winter froze over the sea, and the expanding ice damaged the vessels beyond repair, and they were all scuttled. The last remaining C-class torpedo boats were placed in reserve after this incident.

In 1927, after years of wrangling with various plans for how to modernize the navy, and partly due to the loss of the torpedo boat S2 in heavy seas in October 1925, the Parliament of Finland approved a plan to build two coastal defence ships (Panssarilaiva in Finnish), as well as four submarines. Motor torpedo boats were also acquired both from Britain, as well as from domestic sources. New minesweepers were also constructed. The training ship  was also acquired.

World War II 
The strength of the Finnish Navy at the beginning of World War II was limited. Some of the planned ships had not yet been constructed and wartime constraints on the economy prolonged ship building times.

The Finnish Navy operated the following vessels in the Baltic Sea:
 Two coastal defence ships ( and )
 Five submarines (and )
 Four gunboats (and )
 Seven motor torpedo boats (two , one , four )
 One minelayer
 Eight minesweepers (six , two )
 One training ship 

On Lake Ladoga, the Finns operated:
 One icebreaker (Aallokas)
 One gunboat (Aunus)
 One minelayer (Yrjö)
 One tug (Vakava)
 Two motor boats (S 1 and N. K. af Klercker)

The navy also had several auxiliary warships, icebreakers and patrol boats from the coast guard.

Winter War 

When the Winter War broke out the Finnish Navy moved to occupy the de-militarized Åland Islands and to protect merchant shipping. In the first month of the war, battles between Soviet ships and Finnish coastal batteries were fought at Hanko, Finland, Utö and Koivisto. At Koivisto and Hanko, the batteries forced Soviet battleships to retire with damage. Finnish efforts to use submarines ( and ) to sink Soviet capital ships failed. In December 1939 the ice became so thick that only the icebreakers could still move. The two coastal defence ships were moved to the harbour in Turku where they were used to strengthen the air defences of the city. They remained there for the rest of the war.

Continuation War 

Before the Continuation War five more torpedo boats were ordered from Italy. The base that the Soviets had acquired after the Winter War at the Hanko Peninsula divided the areas where the Finnish Navy would operate in two. This included the coastal artillery positions at Russarö and Osmussaar, which guarded the minefields blocking the entrance to the Eastern Gulf of Finland. Large mine fields were laid down in cooperation with the German Kriegsmarine when the war began. The coastal defence ships bombarded the Soviet base at Hanko until the Soviets evacuated Hanko in December 1941.

Between 1941 and 1945 some 69,779 mines and mine sweeping obstacles were laid in the Gulf of Finland by Finnish, Soviet and German naval forces. The Soviet Navy laid 16,179 mines and 2,441 mine sweeping obstacles, the Finnish navy 6,382 mines, and the German navy's vessels, submarines and aircraft laid some 45,000 mines, of which 3,000 were magnetic mines. The last mine sweeping season was held in 1957, but the mine danger continued for some 10 more years, and there are still hundreds of World War II-era mines in the Baltic Sea. The greatest loss of the Finnish Navy occurred on 13 September 1941 when  ran into a mine and sank. 271 sailors lost their lives and only 132 were rescued. Most of the survivors later served in the Lake Onega flotilla, using old captured ships, including a steam-engined paddlewheeler.

In 1942 the main focus of the war at sea was on anti-submarine warfare. Finnish and German naval forces tried to prevent Soviet submarines from gaining access to the Baltic Sea. However, the mine barrier had proven to be insufficient to completely stop Soviet submarines activities. The Soviet subs sank 18 ships, seven of which were Finnish. 12 Soviet submarines were also sunk - three by Finnish submarines. The next step in submarine warfare was to completely block the Gulf of Finland with anti-submarine nets between Naissaar and Porkkala. This was done immediately after the ice cover melted on the sea. That barrier with its accompanying minefields effectively contained Soviet Naval vessels to the eastern part of the Gulf of Finland until the autumn of 1944, when the Soviets were able to use Finnish coastal seaways to circumvent the barrier.

In spring 1942 Finnish forces captured the island of Gogland. In July 1942 the Soviets made an attempt to occupy the small island of Sommers in the Gulf of Finland. The Soviets lost several smaller vessels (patrol and torpedo boats) together with 128 men. One-hundred and two Soviet soldiers were taken prisoner. During 1943 the navy received 14 new motor torpedo boats which were used to replace the old pre-war ones.

In 1944 the Soviets launched a major offensive against Finland, during which the navy fought in support of Finnish land forces the Gulf of Vyborg. In the end the ships were forced to pull out.

Lapland War 

In September 1944, the military operations against Germany started. The main focus was in the north, the Lapland War, but the Germans also tried to capture Suursaari in an operation named Tanne Ost. The attack was repulsed. During the battle, Finnish motor torpedo boats sank several German vessels.

The last action of the Finnish Navy was during the amphibious landing of troops from Oulu in Tornio. The Finnish gunboats successfully shelled German batteries, which had posed serious threat for the transport ships, while their anti-aircraft batteries defended the convoy from German air attacks. The navy also hunted German U-boats in the Baltic, laying its last mines of the war while doing this.

After the Finnish-Soviet armistice, the Finnish Navy was ordered to participate in the demanding mine clearance operation. The operation lasted until 1950. There were many casualties among the clearance crews.

The Cold War era

The war time fleet was replaced in the 1950s and 1960s. Due to Finland's neutrality she tried to balance her purchases of equipment between the two blocs and also tried to produce its own vessels. A  (Matti Kurki) for training purposes, two  fast patrol boats (Vasama 1 and Vasama 2) and four s were bought from the UK, two s ( and ) and four Osa II-class fast attack craft (s) were obtained from the Soviet Union. Some of the vessels, such as two s ( and ) and the Nuoli-class fast attack craft were produced domestically.

The Paris peace talks in 1947 resulted in a treaty that limited the offensive capability of the Finnish military. For the navy, this meant a limitation to a fleet of no more than 10,000 tons and 4,500 personnel. As for the weaponry, torpedoes, submarines, mines and missiles were forbidden. The restrictions were eased in the 1960s and missiles and mines were allowed. The torpedo restriction was not either fully exercised as the Riga-class frigates were equipped with torpedoes and a number of torpedo boats were manufactured as gunboats that could quickly be converted to carry torpedoes. Torpedoes were re-introduced in 2018.

The Cold War limitations are no longer in place (they were nullified with the breakup of the Soviet Union), but the size of the navy has still remained roughly the same size (with the exception of tonnage).

Current status 
In the late 1990s, the Finnish Navy was developing a new missile squadron called Laivue 2000. At first it was supposed to consist of two Hamina-class missile boats (already built at this date) and four  hovercraft. The Navy experimented with one prototype hovercraft, but announced in 2003 that the Tuuli class would not enter active operations and that no more of them would be built. Instead two new Hamina-class missile boats were built, and the extra weaponry from the hovercraft were installed on the Hämeenmaa-class minelayers.

The cable layer  and pollution control vessel  were replaced in 2011 by a new multipurpose vessel built by the Uudenkaupungin Työvene shipyard. A new icebreaking oil spill response vessel was named  on 8 March 2011.

The 1979-built minelayer  was decommissioned in 2013, after which the minelayer Hämeenmaa took over the role of flagship of the Finnish Navy.

In February 2015, it was reported that fatigue damage had been discovered in the hulls of the recently refitted Rauma-class missile boats and that the vessels would be removed from active duty to prevent further damage until its cause has been found. However, while peacetime use is now limited, the missile boats can be taken back into full service if needed.

In 2018 Finnish Navy announced procurement of IAI's Gabriel 5 naval strike missile system. The system will replace the current maritime anti-ship missile 85M (SAAB RBS15) system, which will reach the end of its life cycle in the 2020s. The new PTO2020 missiles will be installed on Hamina- and Pohjanmaa- class ships and vehicle platforms. The planned life cycle of the system extends to the 2050s. As the Finnish Defence Forces are building multi-branch joint strike capability and Gabriel 5 is capable of strikes to both naval and land domain, the new missile was given designation of PTO2020, (Pinta Torjunta Ohjus 2020 or Surface Strike Missile 2020) instead of old designation(Anti Ship Missile).

Future vessels 
Once Squadron 2000 was operational, the Navy shifted its attention to mine countermeasures with a view to replacing the old Kuha- and Kiiski-class minesweepers with three s, previously known as the MCMV 2010 and MITO classes.

In October 2012, The Finnish Navy signed a 34 million euro contract for 12 fast transport boats with an option for more vessels with Marine Alutech, a Finnish company that had also built the Uisko- and Jurmo-class transport boats. Defensive capability is provided by a remotely controlled turret capable of providing fire support during a landing operation.

The next-generation surface combatant, which will be larger than the current missile boats and more capable for international co-operation, is currently in the pre-development stage. This new class of multi-purpose naval vessels, referred to as Monitoimialus 2020 ("Multi-purpose vessel 2020") or Laivue 2020 ("Squadron 2020") in the preliminary papers, is intended to replace the Hämeenmaa- and Pohjanmaa-class minelayers and Rauma-class missile boats as they are retired. The goal is to replace seven vessels with four new corvette-sized surface combatants. In September 2015, the Finnish Minister of Defence Jussi Niinistö officially authorized the Finnish Navy to start developing "Squadron 2020" and an official Request for Information (RFI) was sent to shipyards in December. Consequently, the Finnish Defence Forces signed a letter of intent with Rauma Marine Constructions for the construction of four vessels under the "Squadron 2020" program on 14 September 2016. The design stage is planned to continue until 2018 and the vessels will be built in 2019–2024. The projected cost of four vessels with a lifespan of at least 35 years is roughly 1.2 billion euro.

On 5 May 2021 the Finnish Ministry of Defense announced that the Finnish Navy was to obtain four Kewatec Work 1920 vessels for delivery between 2022 and 2024. The deal included options for five additional vessels. The contract (including options) is valued 12.8 million Euros.

Equipment

Vessels

Fast attack craft
 Four Hamina-class fast attack craft
 Four Rauma-class fast attack craft

Mine warfare
 Two Hämeenmaa-class minelayers/escort ships
 Three Pansio-class minelayers (one undergoing renovation )
 Three Katanpää-class mine countermeasure vessels
 Three Kuha-class minesweepers
 Six Kiiski-class minesweepers

Coastal forces 
Coastal forces include both coastal infantry and the Marines (Coastal Jaegers) as well as the remnants of the coastal artillery units, which have moved from fixed and towed guns to truck-mounted and infantry-carried anti-ship missiles. The towed guns have been phased out as obsolete and all artillery-based coastal defences are to be retired in the near future.

 Spike-ER coastal missiles (infantry carried)
 MTO-85M anti-ship missiles, truck mounted (SAAB RBS-15SF)
 Coastal artillery with fixed turrets (130 53 TK)
 BOR-A 550 ground and coastal surveillance radar (GSR)

The Euro-Spike coastal missile system was taken into use in 2005 at the Uusimaa Brigade and the older truck-mounted RBS-15 missiles have been complemented with new, upgraded RBS-15 Mk.3 (known as MTO-85M).

Ranks

Commissioned officer ranks
The rank insignia of commissioned officers.

Other ranks
The rank insignia of non-commissioned officers and enlisted personnel.

See also 

Finnish–Estonian defense cooperation

References 

 Finnish Defence Forces Website of The Finnish Defence Forces

External links

 Finnish Navy website
 Finnish Navy in World War II
 Finnish Navy in the Winter War
 Submarine Vesikko